Woolley is the surname of:

People
Albert Woolley (footballer), English footballer
Alma S. Woolley, American nurse, educator, historian and author
Bennie L. Woolley, Jr., American trainer of racing horses
Benjamin Woolley, author, media journalist, television presenter
Bruce Woolley (born 1953), English writer, performer and record producer
Cam Woolley, Ontario Provincial Police officer
Claud Woolley, English cricketer
Edmund Woolley, early American architect and master carpenter
Édouard Woolley, Canadian tenor, actor and composer
Edwin D. Woolley, elected to the Utah Territorial Legislature
Frank Woolley (1887–1978), English Cricketer
Geoffrey Harold Woolley, British Victoria Cross recipient
George Cathcart Woolley, British colonial administrator and ethnographer
Hannah Woolley, early English writer of household management books
Harold Woolley, Baron Woolley, British farmer and life peer
Harry George Woolley, Canadian Lacrosse player and advocate
Helen Thompson Woolley (1874-1947), psychologist and behavioural researcher
Jack Woolley (born 1998) irish taekwondo athlete
James Woolley (1966–2016), keyboard player for the group Nine Inch Nails
Janet McCarter Woolley (1906–1996), American bacteriologist
Jason Woolley, Canadian ice hockey defenseman
John Woolley (disambiguation)
Jordan Woolley, American actor
Joseph Woolley, fellow of the Royal Astronomical Society
Leonard Woolley (1880–1960), British archaeologist
Lorin C. Woolley, leader in the LDS (Mormon) Fundamentalist Movement
Ken Woolley (1933–2015), Australian architect
Mary Emma Woolley, American educator, peace activist, and women's suffrage supporter
Monty Woolley (1888–1963), American actor
Patrick Woolley, American lawyer
Persia Woolley, historical novelist
Richard van der Riet Woolley, British astronomer
Rob Woolley (born 1990), English first-class cricketer
Robert W. Woolley, director of the US Mint and member of the Democratic Party
Roger Woolley, Tasmanian and Australian cricketer
Sarah Woolley (born 1987), British trade union leader
Sarah M. N. Woolley, American neuroscientist
Shawn Woolley, suicidal Everquest player
Stephen Woolley, English film producer and director 
William Woolley, member of the National Liberal Party in the UK

Fictional characters
Bernard Woolley, a main character in the British television series Yes Minister and Yes, Prime Minister

Woolley